In mathematics, a random compact set is essentially a compact set-valued random variable. Random compact sets are useful in the study of attractors for random dynamical systems.

Definition

Let  be a complete separable metric space.

 is also а complete separable metric space.

A random compact set is а measurable function  from а probability space  into .

Put another way, a random compact set is a measurable function  such that  is almost surely compact and

is a measurable function for every .

Discussion

Random compact sets in this sense are also random closed sets as in Matheron (1975). Consequently, under the additional assumption that the carrier space is locally compact, their distribution is given by the probabilities

 for 

(The distribution of а random compact convex set is also given by the system of all inclusion probabilities )

For , the probability  is obtained, which satisfies

Thus the covering function  is given by

 for 

Of course,  can also be interpreted as the mean of the indicator function :

If , is а sequence of i.i.d. random compact sets, then almost surely
 

and  converges almost surely to

References

 Matheron, G. (1975) Random Sets and Integral Geometry. J.Wiley & Sons, New York.
 Molchanov, I. (2005) The Theory of Random Sets.  Springer, New York.
 Stoyan D., and H.Stoyan (1994) Fractals, Random Shapes and Point Fields. John Wiley & Sons, Chichester, New York.

Random dynamical systems
Statistical randomness